WVAC-FM (107.9 FM) is a campus radio station broadcasting a Top 40 and Alternative Rock format. The station is licensed to Adrian College, located on 110 S. Maddison Street.

The station has legally been 107.9 WVAC-FM rather than simply WVAC since 1991.  From then until 2002, the WVAC calls were used by an AM station in Norwalk, Ohio (now WLKR). In the 1968 till 1974 WVAC, the "Voice at Curry", was a carrier-current AM station at Curry College, Milton MA which later became WMLN-FM.

Station Content

Sources 
Michiguide.com - WVAC-FM History

References

 http://tunein.com/radio/WVAC-1079-s23460/
 https://sites.google.com/a/adrian.edu/wvac-radio-video/home

External links

VAC-FM
Radio stations established in 1968